The First Battle of Agordat, the first battle between Italy and Mahdist Sudan, took place on June 27, 1890. Violence began when a force of one-thousand Mahdists attacked tribes that had signed protectorates with the Kingdom of Italy." After that, the Sudanese continued on to the wells at Agordat, where they were met by two companies of Italian-led ascari. The battle that ensued was an Italian victory, with 250 Mahdists being killed. Italian losses were three dead and eight wounded. Author Sean McLachlan blames the Mahdists' "inferior weaponry and fire discipline" for their defeat at Agordat and the upcoming Battle of Serobeti (1892).

References

1890 in Sudan
1890 in the Italian Empire
Agordat
Agordat
Agordat
Agordat
Agordat
June 1890 events